Novoalmetyevo (Yañı Älmät) is a rural locality (a village) in Kileyevsky Selsoviet, Bakalinsky District, Bashkortostan, Russia. The population was 135 as of 2010. There is 1 street.

Geography 
Novoalmetyevo is located 20 km north of Bakaly (the district's administrative centre) by road. Zirikly is the nearest rural locality.

References 

Rural localities in Bakalinsky District